Comibaena cheramota is a moth of the family Geometridae. It was described by Edward Meyrick in 1886. It is found on Fiji.

References

 "Comibaena cheramota Meyrick". Insecta.pro. Retrieved April 18, 2019.

Moths described in 1886
Geometrinae